Zhibek Nukeeva (27 February 1995 – 16 July 2017) was a Kyrgyz model and beauty pageant titleholder who was crowned Miss Kyrgyzstan 2013.

Early life
Nukeeva was a student of business management, and spoke Kyrgyz and French languages. She used to live for a few months in Grenoble, France. She learnt French language in the Alliance Française's school, based in Grenoble.

Family
Zhibek Nukeeva became mother of a baby boy born in November 2016, with her husband Bakyt.

Pageantry

Miss Kyrgyzstan 2013
Nukeeva was crowned as Miss Kyrgyzstan 2013, represented Bishkek.

Miss World 2013
Nukeeva competed at Miss World 2013 in Nusa Dua, Bali, Indonesia.

Death
Zhibek died on 16 July 2017 from chondrosarcoma, a rare cancer that affects the bones and joints. She was living in Bishkek, Kyrgyzstan but was sent by her family to Turkey, to receive higher quality treatment. For the treatment, Zhibek's GoFundMe needed $80,000 to have an operation in Prague, Czech Republic. But after raising $6,172, she died as the cancer had already spread to other parts of the body.

References

External links
Official Website

1995 births
2017 deaths
Deaths from cancer in Turkey
Kyrgyzstani beauty pageant winners
Kyrgyzstani female models
Miss World 2013 delegates
People from Bishkek